Lyser i Mørke is a song by Danish singer Medina from her third studio album For altid. It was released as the fifth single from the album on 12 July 2012. "Lyser i Mørke" peaked at number 5 in Denmark. A music video for the song was recorded on early June, and released the same day of the release of the single.

Track listing
 Danish digital download
 "Lyser i Mørke" – 3:48

Charts and certifications

Charts

Certifications

References

External links
 

2012 singles
Synth-pop songs
Medina (singer) songs
2011 songs
Songs written by Jeppe Federspiel
Songs written by Rasmus Stabell
Songs written by Medina (singer)
Songs written by Engelina